Harpalus hirtipes is a species of ground beetle native to Europe, where it can be found in such countries as Austria, Baltic states, Belarus, Belgium, Bulgaria, Czech Republic, Denmark, France, Germany, Hungary, Italy, Moldova, Poland, Romania, Slovakia, Slovenia, Sweden, Switzerland, Ukraine, and eastern and central parts of Russia. Its wearabouts in Italy and Switzerland is doubtful. It is also found in such Asian countries as Mongolia, Kazakhstan, Kyrgyzstan, and Chinese province of Xinjiang.

References

External links
Male and female Harpalus hirtipes

hirtipes
Beetles of Asia
Beetles of Europe
Beetles described in 1796